Charles Gavan "Chubby" Power,  (18 January 1888 – 30 May 1968) was a Canadian politician and ice hockey player. Many members of his family, including his father, two brothers, a son and a grandson, all had political careers; two of his brothers also played ice hockey.

Early life
Born in Sillery, Power played ice hockey while studying law. From 1906, he played for the Quebec Bulldogs of the Eastern Canada Amateur Hockey Association (ECAHA). A proficient scorer, he scored four goals in one game in 1908 and five goals in a game in 1909.

Military service
Power served overseas in World War I, first as a private in the Westmount Battalion then to 3rd Battalion (Toronto Regiment), CEF as captain and then as an acting major with the  14th Battalion (Royal Montreal Regiment), CEF. He was wounded during the Battle of the Somme. He was awarded the Military Cross for gallantry during military operations.

Political career
He entered politics in the 1917 federal election in which he was elected as a "Laurier Liberal" during the Conscription Crisis of 1917.

In 1935, Power was appointed minister of pensions and health in the Liberal cabinet of Prime Minister William Lyon Mackenzie King. 

During World War II, he served as Acting Minister of National Defence (1940) and Minister of National Defence for Air (1940 to 1945) and was responsible for expanding the Royal Canadian Air Force. His opposition to conscription led him to resign from the cabinet during the Conscription Crisis of 1944, after the government passed an Order in Council to send conscripts overseas. Power sat as an "Independent Liberal" for the duration of the war and was re-elected as an Independent Liberal in the 1945 federal election. He then rejoined the party and ran to succeed King in the 1948 Liberal leadership convention but came a poor third.

Charles Power retired from the House of Commons in 1955. He was appointed to the Senate on 28 July 1955 and served until his death in 1968.

Family
His father, William Power, was also a Member of Parliament from Quebec, retiring in 1917. His brother James was also an ice hockey player. Another brother, Joe, was also an ice hockey player, as well as a Liberal member of the Legislative Assembly of Quebec. Still another brother, William, became a Liberal member of the Legislative Council of Quebec. His son Frank Power also became a Liberal Member of Parliament, as did his grandson Lawrence Cannon, who also became a Conservative cabinet minister and later as Canadian Ambassador to France.

References

 Power, Charles Gavan, 1888–1968 and Ward, Norman, 1918-1990. A party politician: the memoirs of Chubby Power / Edited by Norman Ward. Toronto : Macmillan of Canada, 1966. 419 p. : plates. ; 24 cm.

External links

 
 The Canadian Encyclopedia: Charles Gavan Power
 Charles Gavan Power fonds at Queen's University Archives
 Charles Gavan Power fonds at Library and Archives Canada
 

1888 births
1968 deaths
Anglophone Quebec people
Canadian military personnel of World War I
Canadian senators from Quebec
Independent Liberal MPs in Canada
Laurier Liberals
Lawyers in Quebec
Liberal Party of Canada leadership candidates
Liberal Party of Canada MPs
Liberal Party of Canada senators
Members of the House of Commons of Canada from Quebec
Members of the King's Privy Council for Canada
Politicians from Quebec City
Quebec Bulldogs (NHA) players
Quebec people of Irish descent
Canadian recipients of the Military Cross
Ice hockey people from Quebec City
Canadian people of World War II
Persons of National Historic Significance (Canada)
People from Sainte-Foy–Sillery–Cap-Rouge
Canadian Expeditionary Force soldiers
Canadian Expeditionary Force officers